The Apayao State College (ASC) is a public college in the Philippines. Its main campus is located in Conner, Apayao.

References

External links
 

State universities and colleges in the Philippines
Universities and colleges in Apayao